Raynes Park railway station serves the district of Raynes Park in the London Borough of Merton.

The station is served and operated by South Western Railway, and is in Travelcard Zone 4.
It has 4 platforms and 2 of them are accessible with ramps from the station entrance (those being the platforms to London Waterloo)

History
The railway station at Raynes Park was opened on 30 October 1871 on the London & South Western Railway (L&SWR) line that ran from its terminus at London Waterloo to Woking and beyond. The line runs east by north-east in the London direction and has two through lines (for express services) through the middle and platforms to the outsides.

Raynes Park is the junction station where the line to Motspur Park (and on to Chessington South, Dorking or Guildford) branches off from the South West Main Line ultimately to coastal resorts and port cities.

The track to Epsom was to compete with the London, Brighton and South Coast Railway (LBSCR)'s Mole Valley Lines to Epsom but then use statutory running powers over that line through Ashtead to Leatherhead. From where the London and South Western Railway (LSWR)'s second Guildford track headed via Effingham Junction to Guildford, south-west following its line built from the north. From Epsom, the LBSCR laid the southward track via Dorking (then called Dorking North) to Horsham.

One distinct feature of the station is the long footbridge over the four tracks of the main line which is set at an angle because of the offset of the platforms. This stands out as the main line is on a fairly high embankment (allowing local roads and the Epsom line to pass beneath). Passenger access to the station is via subway at street level on either side of the main line.

There was originally a LSWR mechanical signal box at the far south, opposite platforms 1 and 2, but this was demolished and replaced by modern automated signalling equipment many years ago.

Raynes Park goods yard was in and beyond the notch between Platforms 3 and 4, and was accessed from the Epsom lines. It did not push right up into the point of the V. The goods yard is no longer in use and is now occupied by local manufacturing firms.

Accidents and incidents
On 25 May 1933, a passenger train was derailed approaching the station, coming to rest foul of an adjacent line. Another passenger train was in a side-long collision with it. Five people were killed and 35 were injured. The cause of the accident was the failure to implement a speed restriction on a section of track that was under maintenance.
On 28 November 1967, a newspaper train was derailed entering the station. One of the vans struck the support pillars of the footbridge, severely damaging it. The line was blocked for two days.

Platforms and infrastructure
The station has four platforms on two islands, 1 and 2 on the up lines, and 3 and 4 on the down lines.

Platform 1 is an eastbound platform for services to London Waterloo that have originated from Guildford, Dorking (both via Epsom) or Chessington South.
Platform 2 is an eastbound platform for services to London Waterloo that have originated from Waterloo (via Strawberry Hill on the Kingston loop), Hampton Court or Shepperton and for passing services to London Waterloo that have originated from Woking, Guildford via Cobham & Stoke d’Abernon and Guildford via Woking.
Platform 3 is a westbound platform for trains to Waterloo (via Strawberry Hill on the Kingston loop), Hampton Court or Shepperton and for passing services to Woking, Guildford via Cobham & Stoke d’Abernon and Guildford via Woking.
Platform 4 is a south-westbound platform for trains to Guildford, Dorking (both via Worcester Park and Epsom) or Chessington South.

There are no platforms for the two central fast tracks on the main line, as none of the services using these tracks stop at Raynes Park.

The Epsom to London line, arriving from the south-west, passes under the four main line tracks to the west of the station and then curves up and right to platform 1. Beyond the platforms it makes a trailing junction onto the up slow line to Waterloo. Opposite platform 2 the down Epsom line branches off the down slow main line to arrive at platform 4, on the left side of a V formed with platform 3. The line then drops away to the south to parallel the up Epsom line after the station. The down slow continues straight ahead on the right hand side of the V to platform 3.

Services

Connections
London Buses routes 57, 131, 152, 163, 200 and K5 and night route N87 serve the station.

Refurbishment
Raynes Park railway station was refurbished between March 2009 and July 2009. The refurbishment programme involved constructing a new entrance, ticket office and gateline, and converting the previous ticket office into a new retail unit. Automatic ticket gates were installed at all of the exits to the station, which allowed the station to accept the Oyster "Pay as you go" electronic ticketing system from January 2010. Waiting rooms, toilets, and platform areas were also refurbished to improve passenger safety and comfort.

References

Railway stations in the London Borough of Merton
Railway stations in Great Britain opened in 1871
Former London and South Western Railway stations
Railway stations served by South Western Railway
1933 disasters in the United Kingdom
1871 establishments in England